The Trust Territory of the Pacific Islands (TTPI) was a United Nations trust territory in Micronesia administered by the United States from 1947 to 1994. The Imperial Japanese South Seas Mandate had been seized by the US during the Pacific War. The Federated States of Micronesia, Marshall Islands and Palau are today independent states in a Compact of Free Association with the US. The Northern Mariana Islands remain under US jurisdiction, as an unincorporated territory and commonwealth.

History

Spain initially claimed the islands that later composed the territory of the Trust Territory of the Pacific Islands (TTPI). Subsequently, Germany established competing claims over the islands. The competing claims were eventually resolved in favor of Germany when Spain, following its loss of several possessions to the United States during the Spanish–American War, ceded its claims over the islands to Germany pursuant to the German–Spanish Treaty (1899). Germany, in turn, continued to retain possession until the islands were captured by Japan during World War I. The League of Nations formally placed the islands in the former South Seas Mandate, a mandate that authorized Japanese administration of the islands. The islands then remained under Japanese control until captured by the United States in 1944 during World War II.

The TTPI entered UN trusteeship pursuant to Security Council Resolution 21 on July 18, 1947, and was designated a "strategic area" in its 1947 trusteeship agreement. Article 83 of the UN Charter provided that, as such, its formal status as a UN trust territory could be terminated only by the Security Council, and not by the General Assembly as with other trust territories. The United States Navy controlled the TTPI from a headquarters in Guam until 1951, when the United States Department of the Interior took over control, administering the territory from a base in Saipan.

The Territory contained 100,000 people scattered over a water area the size of continental United States. It was subdivided into six districts, and represented a variety of cultures, with nine spoken languages. The Pohnpeians and Kosraeans, Marshallese and Palauans, Chuukese, Yapese and Chamorros had little in common, except they were in the same general area of the Pacific Ocean.

The large distances between people, lack of an economy, language and cultural barriers, all worked against the union. The six district centers became upscale slums, containing deteriorated Japanese-built roads, with electricity, modern music and distractions, which led to alienated youth and elders. The remainder of the islands maintained their traditional way of life and infrastructure.

In the late 1960s, the U.S. opposed the idea of eventual independence. Instead, they aimed for some form of association, perhaps with Hawaii. They estimated that perhaps 10-25% of the population were at that point in favor of independence.

A Congress of Micronesia first levied an income tax in 1971. It affected mainly foreigners working at military bases in the region.

On October 21, 1986, the U.S. ended its administration of the Marshall Islands District. The termination of U.S. administration of the Chuuk, Yap, Kosrae, Pohnpei, and the Mariana Islands districts of the TTPI soon followed on November 3, 1986. The Security Council formally ended the trusteeship for the Chuuk, Yap, Kosrae, Pohnpei, Mariana Islands, and Marshall Islands districts on December 22, 1990, pursuant to Security Council Resolution 683. On May 25, 1994, the Council ended the trusteeship for the Palau District pursuant to Security Council Resolution 956, after which the U.S. and Palau agreed to establish the latter's independence on October 1.

Geography
The latter area was comparable in size to the continental United States. The water area is about 5% of the Pacific Ocean.

Demographics
The population of the islands was 200,000 in the latter part of the 19th century. The population decreased to 100,000 by 1969 due to emigration, war, and disease. At that time, the population inhabited less than 100 out of 2,141 of the Marshall, Mariana, and Caroline Islands.

Education
In 1947 the Mariana Islands' Teacher Training School (MITTS), a normal school serving all areas of the Trust Territory, opened in Guam. It moved to Chuuk in 1948, to be more central in the Trust Territory, and was renamed Pacific Islands' Teacher Training School (PITTS). It transitioned from being a normal school to a comprehensive secondary school, so it was renamed the Pacific Islands Central School (PICS). The school moved to Pohnpei in 1959. At the time it was a three-year institution housing students who graduated from intermediate schools. The school, later known as Pohnpei Island Central School (PICS), is now Bailey Olter High School.

Palau Intermediate School, established in 1946, became Palau High School in 1962 as it added senior high grades. From the late 1960s to the middle of the 1970s, several public high schools were built or received additions in the Trust Territory. They included Jaluit High School, Kosrae High School, Marshall Islands High School in Majuro, Palau High, PICS, and Truk High School (now Chuuk High School). The Micronesian Occupational College in Koror, Palau was also built. It later merged with the Kolonia-based Community College of Micronesia, which began operations in 1969, into the College of Micronesia-FSM in 1976.

Current status
Following the termination of the trusteeship, the territory of the former TTPI became four separate jurisdictions:

Sovereign states in free association with the United States
The following sovereign states have become freely associated with the United States under the Compact of Free Association (COFA).
  – established 1979, COFA effective October 21, 1986
  – established 1979, COFA effective November 3, 1986
  – established 1981, COFA effective October 1, 1994

Commonwealth in political union with the United States
  – new constitution partially effective January 1, 1978, and fully effective November 4, 1986.

See also
 High Commissioner of the Trust Territory of the Pacific Islands
 Congress of the Trust Territory of the Pacific Islands

References

Bibliography

External links

 Photos from the records of the Trust Territory Government
 1967 Trust Territory of the Pacific Islands Census Geography 
 United States Code: CHAPTER 14 – TRUST TERRITORY OF THE PACIFIC ISLANDS
 PACIFIC ISLANDS REPORT , Pacific Islands Development Program/East-West Center
 Compact of Free Association between the United States and the Federated States of Micronesia As Amended (2003) (pdf, archived from the original on 2003-10-05)

Trust Territory of the Pacific Islands
History of Micronesia
United Nations trust territories
Former colonies in Oceania
Former regions and territories of the United States
States and territories established in 1947
States and territories disestablished in 1994
1947 establishments in Oceania
1994 disestablishments in Oceania
Aftermath of World War II
History of the Federated States of Micronesia
History of the Marshall Islands
History of the Northern Mariana Islands
History of Palau
History of Oceania
Federated States of Micronesia–United States relations
Marshall Islands–United States relations
Palau–United States relations
Treaties of the Federated States of Micronesia
Treaties of the Marshall Islands
Treaties of Palau
Treaties of the United States
Presidency of Harry S. Truman